Remember..., released in Australia under the title In Concert, is the first live album by American singer-songwriter Janis Ian. It was recorded during her 1977 tour of Osaka and Sydney, and released as a double LP in Japan and Australia in 1978, but has never been released in the United States or Europe.

The album was taken from the tour in support of Ian's 1977 album Miracle Row, at a time when she had become much more popular in Japan than she was in the United States – Aftertones had been a number one album in Japan and "Love Is Blind" had topped the charts there for six months. Miracle Row would see her popularity in North America decline even further, and this recording of two 1977 concerts – although no details were ever published as to which recordings came from which – would not be released by Columbia's American or European branches. Ian's first official live album to be issued outside Japan or Australia would not be released until 1999's The Bottom Line Encore Collection.

Remember... includes material from her first four Columbia albums, plus one track from her then-forthcoming 1978 self-titled album and one track, "New York in the Springtime", that remains unique in any form to this release. Her first four albums, which at the time Ian called "a tax write-off for Verve", and 1971's Capitol-issued Present Company are not represented as Janis had by 1977 entirely ceased performing songs from her teenage years.

Track listing

Personnel
 Ed Sprigg – producer, remixing
 Martin Erdmann – engineer
 Gerry Stevens – engineer
 Tom Suzuki – engineer
 Dave Prentiss – assistant engineer
 Carl Gaedt – monitor engineer

Musicians
 Janis Ian – guitars, keyboards, producer, vocals
 Claire Bay – percussion, vocals
 Barry Lazarowitz – drums
 David Wolfert – guitars
 Stu Woods – bass guitar

References

1978 live albums
Janis Ian albums